The Smeatonian Society of Civil Engineers was founded in England in 1771. It was the first engineering society to be formed anywhere in the world, and remains the oldest. It was originally known as the Society of Civil Engineers, being renamed following its founder's death.

History
The first known formal meeting of civil engineers in Britain took place at the King's Head tavern in Holborn, London, on 15 March 1771, when seven of the leading engineers of the time agreed to establish a Society of Civil Engineers. The leading light of the new Society was John Smeaton who was the first engineer to describe himself as a "Civil Engineer", having coined the term to distinguish himself from the military engineers graduating from the Royal Military Academy at Woolwich. The other founding members were Thomas Yeoman, Robert Mylne, Joseph Nickalls, John Grundy, John Thompson and James King. In the first year they were joined by John Golborne, William Black, Robert Whitworth and Hugh Henshall, and these eleven were known as the Original Members.

When the Society was founded its title was the "Society of Civil Engineers". When William Mylne started a new Minute Book in 1822 he used the heading "Engineers' Society" in the reports of each session until 1869, when he changed it to "Smeatonian Society". The Rules and Regulations issued in 1830 bore the title "Smeatonian Society of Civil Engineers" for the first time, which has been its title ever since. Major Henry Watson was the first military engineer to be elected to membership in 1774.

Eventually the Smeatonian Society of Civil Engineers became more of a dining club and a group of younger engineers began to demand a better grouping to aid their profession and the Institution of Civil Engineers was formed in 1818.

The unveiling of a memorial stone to Smeaton in Westminster Abbey on 7 November 1994, by Noel Ordman, President, was described in The Times as 'a triumph for the Smeatonian Society'. Smeaton is also one of six civil engineers depicted in the Stephenson stained glass window, designed by William Wailes and unveiled in 1862.

Present day
The Society continues to this day, mainly as a dining and discussion club of around sixty senior professional engineers, 'distinguished for their work in the theory or practice of design, manufacture, construction or management in the various fields of engineering', up to eighteen retired Members Emeritus and up to fifteen Honorary Members. The late Prince Philip, Duke of Edinburgh (elected 1953) served as president in 1971 and was an active participant until 2017. Anne, Princess Royal (elected 2017) accepted the invitation to be 2021 president, fifty years after her father, and on 8 September 2021 presided at the Society's two hundred and fiftieth anniversary dinner at Trinity House, Tower Hill. Since 1975 the Society has often met at the headquarters of the Institution of Civil Engineers.

Mottos
The Latin motto "Omnia in Numero, Pondere et Mensura" was added to the summons card in 1793; it is adapted from Wisdom of Solomon 11:20 "(Thou hast ordered) all things by number, weight and measure". The proposal of the Reverend William Whewell (Honorary Member 1836) at a meeting on 14 June 1843 was accepted, that a Greek motto (probably from Aristotle) should be added to the summons card: "Τεχνη κρατουμεν ὢν φυσει νικωμεθα"  "By Art we master what would master us". Both mottos are still in use.

Historical membership classes
From 1793 the renewed Society was to be "for promoting and communicating every branch of knowledge useful and necessary to the various and important branches of public and private works in civil engineering". There were three classes of membership:
First Class -  "those who are actually employed in Designing, & forming, Works of different kinds, in the Various Departments of Engineering".
Second Class - "Men of Science and Gentlemen of Fame and Fortune" (Honorary Members).
Third Class -  "Various Artists, whose professions and employments, are necessary & useful thereto as well as connected with Civil Engineering" (Honorary Members).

Women elected include Jean Venables (2003), Joanna Kennedy (2006), Julia Elton FSA (Honorary 2010), Dame Julia Higgins (2012), Bridget Rosewell (Honorary 2016), Dame Ann Dowling (2017), Dame Helen Atkinson (2017), Dame Judith Hackitt (2018), Faith Wainwright (2019) and Dervilla Mitchell (2022).

Presidents 

The following is a list of presidents of the Society from its inception. Honorary Members are shown in italics. In 1793 the Society was reconstituted without a President. The post was reintroduced as an annually elected position in 1841:

Notes

External links
 Smeatonian Society website

Civil engineering organizations
Engineering societies based in the United Kingdom
Institution of Civil Engineers
Organizations established in 1771
1771 establishments in Great Britain